Viktor Babichyn (born 22 August 2000) is a professional Ukrainian football goalkeeper who plays for VPK-Ahro Shevchenkivka on loan from Rukh Lviv.

Career
Babichyn is a product of FC Metalurh Zaporizhya in his native Zaporizhzhia with first trainer Vladyslav Zakharchenko and FC Dnipro youth sportive school systems.

After spent five seasons in FC Dnipro and SC Dnipro-1 and played in the Ukrainian Second League, Ukrainian First League and Ukrainian Premier League Reserves, he signed a contract with Rukh Lviv in September 2020.

References

External links
 Profile at UAF website (Ukr)
 

2000 births
Living people
Footballers from Zaporizhzhia
Ukrainian footballers
FC Dnipro players
SC Dnipro-1 players
FC Rukh Lviv players
FC VPK-Ahro Shevchenkivka players
Ukrainian First League players
Association football goalkeepers
Ukraine youth international footballers
Ukrainian Second League players
21st-century Ukrainian people